Siantar Top is an Indonesian snacks and consumer goods company based in Sidoarjo, East Java.

History 
The company was founded in 1972 with a small industrial scale at that time. Siantar Top was founded by Shindo Sumidomo (Heng Hok Soei), a businessman from Pematangsiantar, North Sumatra, which was then taken from the name of the city. Then, Siantar Top developed in the snack industry, namely snack noodles, crackers and confectionery (candy). In 1987, the company was registered under the name PT Siantar Top Industri based on deed No. 45 dated May 12, 1987 from Endang Widjajanti, notary in Sidoarjo. In 1991, the company began producing candy variants. The company expanded its business by operating other three factories in Medan (1998), Bekasi (2002), and Makassar (2011). In addition, the company also made a coffee processing plant in 2014.

Brands and Products 

 Noodles: Spix Soba Mie Sedap, Spix Mie Goreng, Mie Gemez & Gemez Enaak
 Snacks: Twistko, French Fries 2000 & Leanet, OPotato, TicTic
 Candys: Gaul, Milenium, Tovie & XUXU
 Biscuits: GO! Potato, GO! Malkist, Goriorio, Modena Cookies, Malkrez & Wafer Superman

Ownerships 
List of ownership based on shareholders as 31 December 2014

References

External links 

 Siantar Top official English website
 Siantar Top official Indonesian website

Food and drink companies of Indonesia
Food and drink companies established in 1972
Indonesian brands
1972 establishments in Indonesia
1996 initial public offerings
Companies based in Sidoarjo
Companies listed on the Indonesia Stock Exchange